Kuznets or Kusnets (meaning "blacksmith") is a gender-neutral Russian surname that may refer to:
 Albert Kusnets (1902–1942), Estonian wrestler
George Kuznets (1909–1986), Belarusian-American economist
Lois Rostow Kuznets, American professor of English literature
Simon Kuznets (1901–1985), American economist, statistician, demographer and economic historian

See also

References

Occupational surnames
Russian-language surnames